Long Lake is a lake in Grant County, in the U.S. state of Minnesota.

Long Lake was named from the fact it is much longer than it is wide.

See also
List of lakes in Minnesota

References

Lakes of Minnesota
Lakes of Grant County, Minnesota